Konstantinos Pochanis (born 29 July 1973) is a retired Cypriot athlete who specialised in the 400 metres hurdles. He represented his country at the 2000 Summer Olympics, as well as two World Championships.

His personal best in the event is 49.88 seconds, set in 1999. He also ran personal best of 47.78 in the 400 metres (2001).

Competition record

References

1973 births
Living people
Cypriot male hurdlers
Athletes (track and field) at the 1994 Commonwealth Games
Athletes (track and field) at the 2000 Summer Olympics
Olympic athletes of Cyprus
World Athletics Championships athletes for Cyprus
Commonwealth Games competitors for Cyprus
Athletes (track and field) at the 1991 Mediterranean Games
Athletes (track and field) at the 1993 Mediterranean Games
Athletes (track and field) at the 2001 Mediterranean Games
Mediterranean Games competitors for Cyprus